Étienne Chambaud (born 1980) is a French artist based in Paris.

He graduated from the École cantonale d'art de Lausanne (ECAL) in Lausanne, Switzerland, in 2003, Villa Arson, Nice, in 2005 and the post-graduate program of the École nationale des beaux-arts de Lyon in 2004/2005. He has exhibited at Palais de Tokyo, Villa Arson, Centre Georges Pompidou, Biennale de Lyon 2007, Netwerk, Espace Ricard, Kunsthalle Mulhouse,  and The Drawing Center.

References

External links 
 Étienne Chambaud's website, courtesyoftheartists.com

French contemporary artists
1980 births
Living people
Artists from Paris
Place of birth missing (living people)